Senneçay is a commune in the Cher department in the Centre-Val de Loire region of France.

Geography
The A71 autoroute forms the commune’s western border.

Population

Sights
 The church of St. Pierre, dating from the thirteenth century.

See also
Communes of the Cher department

References

Communes of Cher (department)